The 2017 Championship League was a professional non-ranking snooker tournament that took place from 2 January to 2 March 2017 at the Ricoh Arena in Coventry, England.

Judd Trump was the defending champion, and he made it to the semi-finals, where he lost 2–3 to John Higgins.

The Scotsman then won the final, clinching his first Championship League title with a 3–0 win over Ryan Day. The Welshman took the largest share of the prize money thanks to a lucrative campaign through six groups before qualifying for the winners' group.

Mark Davis made the 127th official maximum break in the deciding 5th frame of his group 3 final against Neil Robertson. This was Davis' first official 147 break and the ninth of the 2016/2017 season. Davis also became the oldest player to make an official 147, at the age of 44. He surpassed the record set by Fergal O'Brien, who scored the first maximum of his career at the age of 43 in a Championship League round robin match against Davis in the previous season. Later on, Davis made the 129th official maximum break in the deciding 5th frame of his Winners' Group round robin match against John Higgins. It was Davis' second official 147 break and the eleventh of the 2016/2017 season. With that, Davis became the first player to make two maximum breaks in a tournament. It was the fourth consecutive year that a maximum was made in the Championship League.

Prize fund 
The breakdown of prize money for this year is shown below.

Group 1–7
Winner: £3,000
Runner-up: £2,000
Semi-final: £1,000
Frame-win (league stage): £100
Frame-win (play-offs): £300
Highest break: £500
Winners' group
Winner: £10,000
Runner-up: £5,000
Semi-final: £3,000
Frame-win (league stage): £200
Frame-win (play-offs): £300
Highest break: £1,000

Tournament total: £181,800

Group 1 
Group 1 was played on 2 and 3 January 2017. David Gilbert was the first player to qualify for the winners group.

Matches 

Anthony McGill 2–3 David Gilbert
Ryan Day 1–3 Matthew Selt
Ben Woollaston 0–3 Anthony McGill
Mark Davis 2–3 Robert Milkins
David Gilbert 0–3 Ryan Day
Mark Davis 3–1 Matthew Selt
Robert Milkins 2–3 Ben Woollaston
Anthony McGill 3–1 Ryan Day
David Gilbert 3–1 Matthew Selt
Mark Davis 1–3 Ben Woollaston
Robert Milkins 1–3 Matthew Selt
Ryan Day 3–1 Ben Woollaston
Anthony McGill 3–1 Robert Milkins
David Gilbert 2–3 Mark Davis
Ryan Day 3–1 Robert Milkins
Matthew Selt 3–2 Ben Woollaston
Anthony McGill 1–3 Mark Davis
David Gilbert 3–2 Ben Woollaston
Ryan Day 2–3 Mark Davis
David Gilbert 3–0 Robert Milkins
Anthony McGill 3–2 Matthew Selt

Table

Play-offs

Group 2 
Group 2 was played on 4 and 5 January 2017. Anthony McGill was the second player to qualify for the winners group.

Matches 

Mark Williams 1–3 Neil Robertson
Michael White 1–3 Matthew Selt
Anthony McGill 3–0 Mark Williams
Mark Davis 2–3 Ryan Day
Neil Robertson 3–1 Michael White
Matthew Selt 0–3 Mark Davis
Ryan Day 3–1 Anthony McGill
Mark Williams 3–0 Michael White
Neil Robertson 1–3 Matthew Selt
Mark Davis 3–1 Anthony McGill
Ryan Day 3–0 Matthew Selt
Michael White 2–3 Anthony McGill
Mark Williams 1–3 Ryan Day
Neil Robertson 3–2 Mark Davis
Michael White 3–2 Ryan Day
Matthew Selt 2–3 Anthony McGill
Mark Williams 2–3 Mark Davis
Neil Robertson 3–2 Anthony McGill
Michael White 2–3 Mark Davis
Neil Robertson 3–1 Ryan Day
Mark Williams 3–1 Matthew Selt

Table

Play-offs

Group 3 
Group 3 was played on 9 and 10 January 2017. Mark Davis was the third player to qualify for the winners group, finishing with a maximum break in the fifth frame decider against Neil Robertson in the group play-off final.

Matches 

Joe Perry 2–3 Barry Hawkins
Ali Carter 3–1 Mark Williams
Neil Robertson 3–1 Joe Perry
Mark Davis 2–3 Ryan Day
Barry Hawkins 3–0 Ali Carter
Mark Williams 0–3 Mark Davis
Ryan Day 3–2 Neil Robertson
Joe Perry 0–3 Ali Carter
Barry Hawkins 0–3 Mark Williams
Mark Davis 3–2 Neil Robertson
Ryan Day 2–3 Mark Williams
Ali Carter 0–3 Neil Robertson
Joe Perry 1–3 Ryan Day
Barry Hawkins 3–1 Mark Davis
Ali Carter 2–3 Ryan Day
Mark Williams 2–3 Neil Robertson
Joe Perry 1–3 Mark Davis
Barry Hawkins 0–3 Neil Robertson
Ali Carter 0–3 Mark Davis
Barry Hawkins 3–1 Ryan Day
Joe Perry 3–1 Mark Williams

Table

Play-offs

Group 4 
Group 4 was played on 11 and 12 January 2017. Barry Hawkins was the fourth player to qualify for the winners group.

Matches 

Shaun Murphy 3–2 Mark Allen
Kyren Wilson 0–3 Mark Williams
Barry Hawkins 3–1 Shaun Murphy
Ryan Day 3–2 Neil Robertson
Mark Allen 1–3 Kyren Wilson
Mark Williams 3–1 Ryan Day
Neil Robertson 2–3 Barry Hawkins
Shaun Murphy 3–1 Kyren Wilson
Mark Allen 1–3 Mark Williams
Barry Hawkins 1–3 Ryan Day
Neil Robertson 3–1 Mark Williams
Kyren Wilson 0–3 Barry Hawkins
Shaun Murphy 1–3 Neil Robertson
Mark Allen 0–3 Ryan Day
Kyren Wilson 3–2 Neil Robertson
Mark Williams 1–3 Barry Hawkins
Shaun Murphy 3–0 Ryan Day
Mark Allen 1–3 Barry Hawkins
Kyren Wilson 3–2 Ryan Day
Mark Allen 3–1 Neil Robertson
Shaun Murphy 2–3 Mark Williams

Table

Play-offs

Group 5 
Group 5 was played on 20 and 21 February 2017. Judd Trump was the fifth player to qualify for the winners group.

Matches 

Stuart Bingham 2–3 Judd Trump
Liang Wenbo 3–1 Kyren Wilson
Ryan Day 0–3 Stuart Bingham
Shaun Murphy 2–3 Mark Williams
Judd Trump 3–2 Liang Wenbo
Kyren Wilson 2–3 Shaun Murphy
Mark Williams 2–3 Ryan Day
Stuart Bingham 3–1 Liang Wenbo
Judd Trump 3–0 Kyren Wilson
Shaun Murphy 1–3 Ryan Day
Mark Williams 3–1 Kyren Wilson
Liang Wenbo 0–3 Ryan Day
Stuart Bingham 2–3 Mark Williams
Judd Trump 3–2 Shaun Murphy
Liang Wenbo 1–3 Mark Williams
Kyren Wilson 3–0 Ryan Day
Stuart Bingham 1–3 Shaun Murphy
Judd Trump 3–1 Ryan Day
Liang Wenbo 0–3 Shaun Murphy
Judd Trump 3–2 Mark Williams
Stuart Bingham 0–3 Kyren Wilson

Table

Play-offs

Group 6 
Group 6 was played on 22 and 23 February 2017. Ryan Day was the sixth player to qualify for the winners group. It was also his sixth try, as he had been part of the tournament since the first group was played out.

Matches 

Mark Selby 1–3 Ricky Walden
Martin Gould 3–2 Stuart Bingham
Ryan Day 0–3 Mark Selby
Shaun Murphy 3–2 Mark Williams
Ricky Walden 3–2 Martin Gould
Stuart Bingham 3–1 Shaun Murphy
Mark Williams 3–2 Ryan Day
Mark Selby 0–3 Martin Gould
Ricky Walden 2–3 Stuart Bingham
Shaun Murphy 0–3 Ryan Day
Mark Williams 0–3 Stuart Bingham
Martin Gould 1–3 Ryan Day
Mark Selby 2–3 Mark Williams
Ricky Walden 0–3 Shaun Murphy
Martin Gould 3–2 Mark Williams
Stuart Bingham 1–3 Ryan Day
Mark Selby 3–0 Shaun Murphy
Ricky Walden 3–2 Ryan Day
Martin Gould 3–1 Shaun Murphy
Ricky Walden 3–1 Mark Williams
Mark Selby 3–1 Stuart Bingham

Table

Play-offs

Group 7 
Group 7 was played on 27 and 28 February 2017. John Higgins was the seventh and final player to qualify for the winners group.

Matches 

John Higgins 3–2 Michael Holt
Graeme Dott 1–3 Mark Selby
Stuart Bingham 3–2 John Higgins
Ricky Walden 2–3 Martin Gould
Michael Holt 3–2 Graeme Dott
Mark Selby 3–0 Ricky Walden
Martin Gould 0–3 Stuart Bingham
John Higgins 3–2 Graeme Dott
Michael Holt 3–1 Mark Selby
Ricky Walden 2–3 Stuart Bingham
Martin Gould 3–1 Mark Selby
Graeme Dott 0–3 Stuart Bingham
John Higgins 3–1 Martin Gould
Michael Holt 2–3 Ricky Walden
Graeme Dott 3–0 Martin Gould
Mark Selby 0–3 Stuart Bingham
John Higgins 3–1 Ricky Walden
Michael Holt 0–3 Stuart Bingham
Graeme Dott 1–3 Ricky Walden
Michael Holt 3–1 Martin Gould
John Higgins 1–3 Mark Selby

Table

Play-offs

Winners' Group 
The Winners' Group was played on 1 and 2 March 2017. In the final, John Higgins defeated Ryan Day 3–0 to win the Championship League title for the first time in his career.

Matches 

David Gilbert 3–0 Anthony McGill
Mark Davis 1–3 Barry Hawkins
Judd Trump 3–0 David Gilbert
Ryan Day 3–2 John Higgins
Anthony McGill 0–3 Mark Davis
Barry Hawkins 3–2 Ryan Day 
John Higgins 3–1 Judd Trump
David Gilbert 1–3 Mark Davis
Anthony McGill 3–1 Barry Hawkins
Ryan Day 1–3 Judd Trump
John Higgins 1–3 Barry Hawkins
Mark Davis 1–3 Judd Trump
David Gilbert 0–3 John Higgins
Anthony McGill 1–3 Ryan Day
Mark Davis 3–2 John Higgins
Barry Hawkins 2–3 Judd Trump
David Gilbert 2–3 Ryan Day
Anthony McGill 1–3 Judd Trump
Mark Davis 1–3 Ryan Day
Anthony McGill 2–3 John Higgins
David Gilbert 1–3 Barry Hawkins

Table

Play-offs

Century breaks 
Total: 112

 147 (W), 147 (3), 142, 132, 130, 110  Mark Davis
 144 (7), 108  Graeme Dott
 143, 142 (5), 140 (4), 136 (2), 121, 118, 106, 105  Mark Williams
 143, 138, 137, 123, 120, 116  John Higgins
 142 (6), 137, 105, 102  Ricky Walden
 141, 126, 106, 102  Shaun Murphy
 140, 133, 131, 114, 113, 112, 111,106, 105, 101, 101, 100, 100  Judd Trump
 138, 119, 119, 115  Martin Gould
 137, 137, 136, 135 (1), 129, 124, 123, 120,117, 117, 117, 116, 114, 112, 104, 103, 101  Ryan Day
 135, 130, 128, 127, 119, 117, 105,104, 103, 102, 100, 100, 100  Neil Robertson
 131, 126, 118, 101  Mark Selby
 130, 123, 114, 112, 112, 110, 107, 101  Stuart Bingham
 130  Joe Perry
 122, 108, 107  Anthony McGill
 121, 114, 112, 105, 102  David Gilbert
 117, 111, 107, 107, 105, 103, 101  Barry Hawkins
 115  Liang Wenbo
 115  Matthew Selt
 113  Ali Carter
 112, 107  Kyren Wilson
 103  Mark Allen
 100  Michael White

Bold: highest break in the indicated group.

Winnings 

Green: won the group. Bold: highest break in the group. All prize money in GBP.

References

External links 
 http://www.championshipleaguesnooker.co.uk/players/

2017
2017 in snooker
2017 in English sport
Sports competitions in Coventry
January 2017 sports events in the United Kingdom
Championship League
Championship League